"If I Know Me" is a song written by Pam Belford and Dean Dillon, and performed by American country music artist George Strait. It was released in March 1991 as the first single to his album Chill of an Early Fall. It peaked at number 1 on both the U.S. Billboard Hot Country Singles & Tracks chart and the Canadian RPM Country Tracks chart.

Content
The narrator has just left his lover, but he knows that if he knew himself, then he'd turn his car around, and not get out of town, and come running back to her.

Music video
The music video was directed by Bill Young and filmed at Victoria's Black Swan Inn in San Antonio.

Chart positions

Year-end charts

References

1991 singles
George Strait songs
Songs written by Dean Dillon
Song recordings produced by Jimmy Bowen
MCA Records singles
1991 songs